John Paul Thomas (4 February 1927, Bessemer, Alabama – 5 September 2001, Honolulu, Hawaii) was an American artist specializing in oil painting, watercolor and drawing in several media. He was also an educator and arts scholar.

Life 
John Paul Thomas was the third of four children born to Paul B. Thomas and Annie Watson Thomas. He enlisted in the Navy fall of 1944 and received a medical discharge the following summer. He received a B.A. degree in 1951 from The New School [for Social Research] and an M.A. degree in 1954 from New York University where he studied with William Baziotes. He spent a year (1954-1955) in Rome, Italy studying Italian Renaissance painting. Upon returning to the U.S. he established his studio in Los Angeles (1956-1959), then San Francisco (1959-1963) and Marin County (1963-1970). He moved to the Kona District of Hawaii Island in 1970 where he worked for thirty-one years until his death due to complications from myasthenia gravis. He is buried at the Kona Veterans Cemetery.

Career 

Thomas is among the foremost painters of Hawaii. His work has been exhibited nationally and internationally in over 200 solo and group exhibitions in museums, universities and art galleries including one man shows at the Alan Gallery (Charles Alan formerly assisted Edith Halpert at the Downtown Gallery), New York (1958-1961); Paul Kantor Gallery, Beverly Hills, California (1956-1958); the Esther Robles Gallery, La Cienega Boulevard, Los Angeles (1958-1974); the Birmingham Museum of Art, Birmingham, Alabama (1954, 1964); University of Iowa, Iowa City (1963); University of Arizona, Tempe (1963); Oklahoma Art Center at the University of Oklahoma, Oklahoma City (1964); Colorado Springs Fine Arts Center, Colorado (1964); Rice University, Houston, Texas (1969); Foster Gallery, University of Wisconsin-Eau Claire (1976); and various sites throughout Hawaii including the University of Hawaii, Volcano Art Center, and the East Hawaii Cultural Center. Group shows include the Kootz Gallery, New York (1950); Galleria Schneider, Rome (1955); Wichita Art Museum, Kansas (1957); Pacific Coast Biennial – Santa Barbara Museum of Art, San Francisco Legion of Honor, Portland Art Museum, Seattle Art Museum; University of Nebraska Annual, Lincoln, Nebraska; Whitney Museum of American Art Annual, New York; Annual Exhibitions, San Francisco Museum of Modern Art; Lee Nordness Gallery, New York; Tucson Arts Center, Arizona; Speed Art Museum, Louisville, Kentucky; Laguna Beach Art Association, California; Virginia Museum of Fine Arts, Richmond; Phoenix Art Museum, Arizona; Marin Museum, San Rafael, California; Occidental College, Los Angeles, California; Honolulu Academy of Arts [now Honolulu Museum of Art]; and the American Library, Bucharest, Romania.

Teaching 
He began his teaching career at the Detroit Institute of Arts, Detroit, Michigan (1955-1956). He was Visiting Professor of Life Drawing at the University of Iowa, Iowa City (1962-1963) and taught at San Francisco State University Art Department (1964-1965). He then taught at the University of Hawaii at Hilo (1965-1967) and University of Hawaii at Manoa School of Art in Honolulu (1966). He occupied the Ames Walker Professorship Chair in the School of Art at the University of Washington, Seattle (1968-1969).

Awards and honors 
Thomas received residence fellowships at Yaddo Foundation (1954) and Huntington Hartford Foundation, Pacific Palisades, Los Angeles, California (1957 and 1962), a National Endowment for the Arts grant (1975), and commissions from the Hawaii State Foundation on Culture and the Arts and Delta Air Lines. The Hawaii State Senate, Hawaii State House of Representatives and the Hawaii Island County Council have issued him commendations for his contributions to the culture of the Islands. The Hawaii State Foundation on Culture and the Arts has purchased his work for the State Collection, and he has received commissions to create art for state buildings, most notably to create a memorial painting for the 150th anniversary of Washington Place, former home of Queen Liliuokalani and Hawaii State Governors, now a National Historic Landmark.

Significant series of paintings 
Thomas often did series of paintings centering on one subject. The first significant series was on the subject of allegorical figures, reaching an early high point with the oil painting "Triptych with Predella – the Seasons" (1959) (collection of the Orange County Museum of Art), and continuing throughout his life culminating in the oil "The Tempest" (1997). It included paintings of deities from Hawaiian mythology including Hina (goddess of the moon), Kamapua'a (pig demigod) and the volcano goddess Pele. His "Homage to Gaea", which occupied the last fifteen years of his life, combined bold color-shapes of tropical foliage with a technique of painting that reflected back to his abstract expressionist youth. His "Orchids of Hawaii" watercolor series covers the entire time he lived in Kona and resulted in over two hundred paintings of numerous species of orchids, culminating in the triptych "Hilo Garden", 40 by 54 inches (1987). His best-known series is "Boy with Goldfish" comprising seven large oil paintings and smaller oil studies, and a suite of seventeen pencil drawings titled "The Battle". This series inspired Hawaiian folk singing duo Leon Siu and Malia Elliott to create a series of songs which were later developed into a large concert work for soloists, chorus, orchestra and organ by composer Jerre Tanner. The paintings and drawings were exhibited at The Contemporary Museum [now part of the Honolulu Museum of Art] as part of the Honolulu Symphony Orchestra's premiere of the music in October, 1976. The music was recorded in 1979 by the London Symphony Orchestra using Soundstream digital recording technology. Excerpts were released on Varèse Sarabande LP in 1980 and the complete work on Albany Records SACD (1994) with Thomas paintings reproduced on the covers. The No. 1 painting "Rainbow Birth" was chosen for the cover of the Brubeck-LaVergne Trio jazz LP "See How It Feels".

Scholarly studies 

Even though Thomas has early roots in Abstract Expressionism, through Baziotes at New York University, critics early on saw him as a maverick, unconcerned with contemporary trends in the arts environment. While his peers were throwing off the trappings of previous conventions, Thomas was developing a system of grids to control the interplay between the two-dimensional surface of a painting and a symbolic third dimension within. He traced the source of the concept to his early studies of Italian Renaissance painters and the architect Frank Lloyd Wright, several of whose students were close personal friends. He named his personal application of the grid to the construction of his painting "Symbolic Stereometry". All his work from the end of his first year teaching at the University of Hawaii, Hilo Campus (1966) on, come under the influence of the grid. Concurrently, his response to the quality of light in Hawaii and the tropical vegetation resulted in a parallel study of color, particularly the manner in which the eye perceives color in relation to the colors surrounding it. Over forty years’ of studies on these two subjects are housed at Rod Library Special Collections, University of Northern Iowa, Cedar Falls, Iowa.

Bibliography 
 LIFE magazine; Fine Arts in the Market Place; New York September 19, 1960
 Hood, Mantle; Contribution to Hawaiian Music; Ha’ilono Mele, the Hawaiian Music Foundation Journal, vol. 11, no.8, pages 6 – 8; Honolulu, Hawaii 1976
 Hess, Harvey; John Thomas, Artist of Kona; Aloha, the Magazine of Hawaii; January/February 1980; Honolulu, Hawaii
 Orchid Art and the Orchid Isle; orchid paintings and drawings; co-authored with poet Harvey Hess; Malama Arts, Honolulu, Hawaii 1982 
 Western’s World; cover; Western Airlines in-flight magazine; vol. 15, no. 8, August, 1984; Los Angeles, California
 Longman, Robin, ed.; cover; American Artist magazine annual travel issue; vol. 50, no. 512; New York 1985
 Hawaii Island Artists and Friends of the Arts; cover art and article; volume I, Malama Arts, Honolulu, Hawaii (1989) ; volume II 1991 ; volume III (1997) 
 Spirit of Aloha; cover; magazine, vol. 19, no. 2, February 1994; Honolulu, Hawaii
 Tanner, Jerré; On the Origins and Application of the Grid in the Art of John Paul Thomas; UNIversitas, University of Northern Iowa online publication; Volume 3, Issue 1 (Fall 2007)

See also 
 List of American artists 1900 and after
 List of artists who painted Hawaii and its people 
 List of New York University alumni#Press, literature and arts

References

External links 
Albany Records
Jerré Tanner for images of selected Thomas paintings and graphics accompanying music videos
Special Collections, Rod Library, University of Northern Iowa
UNIversitas, University of Northern Iowa detailed exposition of Thomas' grid concept with reproductions of examples and corresponding paintings
 Collaborator with Harvey Hess and Jerré Tanner

1927 births
2001 deaths
20th-century American painters
American male painters
The New School alumni
New York University alumni
20th-century American male artists